Vasily Petrovich Zvyozdochkin (1876–1956) was a Russian woodturner, wood carver and doll maker. He is credited with making the first Russian matryoshka doll (painted by Sergey Malyutin) in 1890.

References 
 Василий Звездочкин - отец русской матрешки (Vasily Zvyozdochkin - the father of Russian Matryoshka) 
 Подлинная история Матрешки. Часть третья: Василий Звёздочкин (The true story of the Matryoshka Doll. Part Three: Vasily Zvezdochkin)

Inventors from the Russian Empire
1876 births
1956 deaths
Dollmakers